Lucky Msiska (born 17 March 1960) is a Zambian football manager and former player who played as a midfielder.

Playing career
Born in Northern Rhodesia (now Zambia), Msiska played club football for local side Power Dynamos F.C. before signing with Belgian club K.F.C. Roeselare.

Msiska played for the Zambia national team at the 1988 Summer Olympics in Seoul. He also played for the senior side at the 1990 African Cup of Nations and appeared in several FIFA World Cup qualifying matches.

Managerial career
Following his playing career, Msiska became a manager of youth clubs in Belgium. He joined the technical staff of the Zambian national team in 2005. Msiska also managed the Zambia national under-23 football team in the qualifiers for the 2012 Summer Olympics.

References

External links
 

1960 births
Living people
Zambian footballers
Association football midfielders
Zambia international footballers
Olympic footballers of Zambia
Footballers at the 1988 Summer Olympics
1990 African Cup of Nations players
Power Dynamos F.C. players
K.S.V. Roeselare players
Zambian expatriate footballers
Zambian expatriate sportspeople in Belgium
Expatriate footballers in Belgium